The Edoid languages are a few dozen languages spoken in Southern Nigeria, predominantly in the former Bendel State. The name Edoid derives from its most widely spoken member, Edo, the language of Benin City, which has 25 million native and secondary speakers.

Classification

Elugbe (1989)
The following classification is based on that of Elugbe (1989).
 Delta: Degema, Epie, Ẹgẹnẹ (Engenni)
 North-Central
 Edo: Edo (Bini), Ivbiosakon (Ora, Emai, Iuleha), Esan (Ishan)
 Yekhee: Ghotuo, Yekhee, Enwan, Igwe, Ikpeshi, Okpela (Ivbie North, Arhe), Ososo, Sasaru, Uneme
 ?Ihievbe
 Northwestern:
 Osse River: Ehuẹun–Ukue, Iyayu–Uhami
 Southern Northwestern: Okpamheri, Akuku, Okpe, Oloma
 ?Aduge
 Southwestern: Isoko, Urhobo, Eruwa, Okpe, Uvbie
Ihievbe and Aduge are unclassified within their branches.

Lewis (2013)
An alternative classification of the Edoid languages by Lewis (2013:160):

North-Central
Ghotuo, Sasaru, Igwe, Ososo
Eese-Ihievbe, Uneme-Yekhee, Uokha-Uroe-Ake-Warake, Ikhin-Arokho, Esan, Bini
North-Western
Okpella, North Ibie
Atte, Enwa, Ikpeshi
Ibilo, Dagbala, Aiyegunle, Somorika
Akuku
Okpe
South-Western
Okpe
Urhobo
Isoko
Eruwa
Delta
Eipe-Atisa
Egene (Engenni)
Degema

Names and locations
Below is a list of language names, populations, and locations from Blench (2019).

Comparative vocabulary
Sample basic vocabulary for some northern Edoid languages from Lewis (2013):

Phonology 
Proto-Edoid is reconstructed as having a contrast between oral and nasal consonants and oral and nasal vowels typical for the region. However, in some Edoid languages nasal vowels have been reanalyzed as allophones of oral vowels after nasal consonants, and in others nasal consonants have been reanalyzed as allophones of oral consonants before nasal vowels, reducing the number of phonemically nasal consonants. Urhobo retains three nasals, and has five oral consonants with nasal allophones, ; in Edo this is reduced to one phonemic nasal, but eight additional consonants with nasal allophones, ; and in Ukue there are no indisputably phonemic nasals and only two consonants with nasal allophones, .

See also
List of Proto-Edoid reconstructions (Wiktionary)

Footnotes

References 
Frank Kügler, Caroline Féry, Ruben Van De Vijver (2009) Variation and Gradience in Phonetics and Phonology
Elugbe, Ben Ohiọmamhẹ. 1989a. "Edoid". In Bendor-Samuel (Ed.), The Niger–Congo Languages. Lanham: The United Press of America. 291-304.
Elugbe, Ben Ohiọmamhẹ. 1989b. Comparative Edoid: phonology and lexicon. Delta Series No. 6. Port Harcourt: University of Port Harcourt Press.
Blench, Roger. Delta Edoid wordlists.

 
Volta–Niger languages